Wang Bing (born 1967) is a Chinese director, often referred to as one of the foremost figures in documentary film-making. Wang is the founder of his own production company, Wang Bing Studios, which produces most of his films. His movie on Chinese labour camps, The Ditch, was included in the 2010 Venice Film Festival as the film sorpresa.

Recognition
Tie Xi Qu, Wang's 9 hour epic documentary of industrial China, was considered a major success. Tie Xi Qu went on to win the Grand Prix at the Marseille Festival of Documentary Film and was shown for the first time in Spain at the Punto de Vista International Documentary Film Festival. Wang's film Fengming, a Chinese Memoir, premiered at both Cannes and Toronto in 2007. Crude Oil premiered at the 2008 Rotterdam Film Festival. Since then, his films became a staple at every prestigious international film festival. 2017's Mrs. Fang was awarded the Golden Leopard at the 70th Locarno Festival.

French philosopher Georges Didi-Huberman dedicated a long epilogue to Wang Bing in his 2012 book, Peuples exposés, peuples figurants. He reflects on the social fate of images thoroughly analyzing Wang's 2010 Man with No Name, writing that the director, as a humble portrait artist of a single rural worker, manages to represent the whole of China's people (as well as people from all over the World) "not through his past, nor his ideas, nor his name, nor his place in society, but through the simple gestures with which he works at his solitary life", as opposed to the common epic portraits of national identity based on military prowess, war heroes and manifest destinies.

Filmography

References

External links
 
 ejumpcut.org
 «I am just a simple individual who films what he loves to film». Interview with Wang Bing La furia umana, n. 20, Summer 2014 [lafuriaumana.it]
 Interview: Wang Bing Film Comment, February 2017

1967 births
Living people
Chinese documentary filmmakers
Chinese documentary film directors
Film directors from Shaanxi

Chinese film directors